The Castra of Jac was a fort made of earth in the Roman province of Dacia. It was erected in the 2nd century AD. Not far from the fort, the remains of a previous fortification (built in the 1st century BC) and of a Roman watchtower were unearthed. The fort and the watchtower were abandoned in the 3rd century. Traces of the castra can be identified on Citera Hill in Jac (commune Creaca, Romania).

See also
List of castra

Notes

External links
Roman castra from Romania - Google Maps / Earth

Roman legionary fortresses in Dacia
Roman legionary fortresses in Romania
History of Crișana
Historic monuments in Sălaj County